Shane Austin Baz (born June 17, 1999) is an American professional baseball pitcher for the Tampa Bay Rays of Major League Baseball (MLB). He made his MLB debut in 2021.

Early life 
Baz was born to Lebanese father Raja and American mother Tammy. His father was born in Beirut, Lebanon, and played soccer in his native country before moving to the United States at the age of 15.

Amateur career
Baz attended Concordia Lutheran High School in Tomball, Texas. As a junior, he had a 1.06 earned run average (ERA) with 46 strikeouts over 23 innings. Baz was a member of the United States national team in 2016. Baz committed to Texas Christian University (TCU) to play college baseball. Considered one of the top prospects for the 2017 Major League Baseball draft, the Pittsburgh Pirates selected him with the 12th overall pick. He officially signed with the Pirates a few days after the draft.

Professional career

Pittsburgh Pirates
Baz spent 2017 with the Gulf Coast League Pirates, posting an 0–3 record with a 3.80 ERA in  innings pitched. MLB.com ranked Baz as Pittsburgh's third best prospect going into the 2018 season. He pitched for the Bristol Pirates of the Rookie-level Appalachian League.

Tampa Bay Rays
On August 14, 2018, Baz was acquired by the Tampa Bay Rays as a player to be named later from an earlier trade in which the Pirates also sent Tyler Glasnow and Austin Meadows to the Rays for Chris Archer. The Rays assigned him to the Princeton Rays of the Appalachian League. Over 12 starts between Bristol and Princeton, Baz went 4–5 with a 4.47 ERA and a 1.62 WHIP. Baz began the 2019 season in extended spring training before reporting to the Bowling Green Hot Rods in early May. Over 17 starts with Bowling Green, Baz went 3–2 with a 2.99 ERA, striking out 87 batters over  innings. He was selected to play in the Arizona Fall League for the Salt River Rafters following the season. In June 2021, Baz was selected to play in the All-Star Futures Game.

Baz was promoted to the major leagues on September 20, 2021, to make his debut that same night at Tropicana Field. He started against the Toronto Blue Jays and threw five innings in which he gave up two earned runs on two hits (both were home runs) while striking out five.  He made his post-season starting debut in the second game of the American League Division Series against the Boston Red Sox on October 8, 2021.

On April 16, 2022, Baz was placed on the 60-day injured list as he continued his recovery from arthroscopic elbow surgery, which he underwent in late March. He was activated on June 11. He made 6 starts for the Rays, recording a 1–2 record and 5.00 ERA with 30 strikeouts and 27.0 innings pitched. He was placed back on the injured list on July with a right elbow strain, and was transferred to the 60-day injured list on July 16 after receiving a platelet-rich plasma injection. On September 28, Baz underwent Tommy John surgery, ending his 2022 and 2023 seasons.

International career
On July 2, 2021, Baz was named to the roster for the United States national baseball team for the 2020 Summer Olympics, held in 2021 in Tokyo. The team won the silver medal, losing to Japan in the gold-medal game.

See also

 List of Olympic medalists in baseball
 List of people from Houston

References

External links

1999 births
Living people
American people of Lebanese descent
Sportspeople of Lebanese descent
People from Cypress, Texas
Baseball players from Texas
Major League Baseball pitchers
Tampa Bay Rays players
Gulf Coast Pirates players
Bristol Pirates players
Princeton Rays players
Bowling Green Hot Rods players
Salt River Rafters players
Montgomery Biscuits players
Durham Bulls players
Baseball players at the 2020 Summer Olympics
Olympic baseball players of the United States
Medalists at the 2020 Summer Olympics
Olympic silver medalists for the United States in baseball